Rondo in C minor may refer to:

 Rondo in C minor (Bruckner)
 Rondo in C minor (Chopin)